Sierra Championship Boxing is a boxing video game developed by Evryware and published by Sierra On-Line in 1983. Versions were released for Apple II, Commodore 64, IBM PC compatibles (as a self-booting disk), and Macintosh.

Gameplay
The player can control the boxer during the rounds or act as cornerman, issuing instructions between rounds. The game also allows for simulated matches with no player input. The player can choose from a roster of real fighters from different eras, or create a boxer with customized abilities.

Development
Sierra Championship Boxing was the first PC game Evryware developed. The game was initially going to be published by Microsoft, but  Microsoft decided at the last minute that the home market wasn't big enough yet. Evryware's contact at Microsoft told Ken Williams at Sierra On-Line about the game; Sierra offered Evryware a contract and published the game in 1983.

Reception
InfoWorld called Sierra Championship Boxing "by far the most extensive sports game created for a microcomputer" and suggested that the game "could usher in a new era of sports simulation games" that use "the power and memory of the IBM PC and PC Jr" to store detailed information about real people. Computer Gaming World reviewed the Commodore version negatively. The reviewer praised the game's options and graphics, but criticized its lack of realism. PC Magazine gave the game 14.5 points out of 18, calling it "one of those breakthrough games that comes along ever so infrequently these days ... Championship Boxing is a knockout".

References

External links
Review in GAMES magazine

1983 video games
Apple II games
Boxing video games
Classic Mac OS games
Commodore 64 games
Evryware games
Single-player video games
Video games about kangaroos and wallabies
Video games developed in the United States